Pleromella is a monotypic moth genus of the family Noctuidae. Its only species, Pleromella opter, is found in western North America in southern Oregon, California and Baja California. Both the genus and species were first described by Harrison Gray Dyar Jr. in 1921.

References

Cuculliinae
Monotypic moth genera